Volume is the sixth studio album from Welsh rock band Skindred. It was released on 30 October 2015.

Reception 
The album has been given particularly favourable reviews by critics, many of whom consider it more melodic in texture than prior albums.

The three interludes present on the album were met with a generally more mixed reception; "I"'s use of air horns has been singled out in particular due to their obscurity in the genre.

Track listing

Personnel 
Skindred
 Benji Webbe – vocals, synths
 Daniel Pugsley – bass
 Mikey Demus – guitar, backing vocals
 Arya Goggin – drums

References 

2015 albums
Skindred albums
Napalm Records albums